Jeffrey A. Bradley (born May 3, 1957) is an American politician. He is a member of the South Carolina House of Representatives from the 123rd District, serving since 2014. He is a member of the Republican party.

Bradley is Chair of the House Regulations and Administrative Procedures Committee.

Electoral history

References

Living people
1957 births
Republican Party members of the South Carolina House of Representatives
21st-century American politicians
University of North Alabama alumni
Politicians from Florence, Alabama